The 1986 Miami Hurricanes baseball team represented the University of Miami in the 1986 NCAA Division I baseball season. The Hurricanes played their home games at Mark Light Field. The team was coached by Ron Fraser in his 24th season at Miami.

The Hurricanes reached the College World Series, where they finished third after recording wins against Oklahoma State, and eventual champion Arizona and a pair of losses to eventual runner-up Florida State.

Personnel

Roster

Coaches

Schedule and results

References

Miami Hurricanes baseball seasons
Miami Hurricanes
College World Series seasons
Miami Hurricanes baseball